The Silver Siege Rhyton is a silver vessel discovered in Shaft Grave IV of Grave Circle A at Mycenae and is dated to c. 1600–1500 BCE, or during the Late Helladic I period.  The rhyton was likely used for the transportation of libation for use in sacred ritual and is so named for its relief depicting an attack on a fortified town.  The abundance of precious metalwork and weaponry both votive and practical discovered in Shaft Grave IV suggests that it was the burial place of a warrior chieftain or a member of his family.

References

Mycenaean art
Archaeological artifacts
16th-century BC works
Mycenae
Ancient Greek metalwork